Sneezing powder is a group of powders or powder-like substances that induce sneezing when someone is exposed to them. This is usually done as a practical joke or prank to an unsuspecting victim.

Sneezing powders containing Veratrum album alkaloids have been linked to poisoning, including upset stomach, fainting, slowed heart rate and low blood pressure. Children are especially vulnerable.

The plant containing this chamissonolide is actually eponymously called sneezeweed.

See also
Itching powder
 List of practical joke topics
 Photic sneeze reflex (sun sneezing), a genetic disorder

References

Sneeze
Practical joke devices
Powders